Granastyochus picticauda is a species of longhorn beetle of the subfamily Lamiinae. It was described by Henry Walter Bates in 1881, and is known from Guatemala and Panama.

References

Beetles described in 1881
Acanthocinini